Armand Genoud (born 6 July 1930) is a Swiss cross-country skier. He competed in the men's 30 kilometre event at the 1956 Winter Olympics.

References

1930 births
Living people
Swiss male cross-country skiers
Olympic cross-country skiers of Switzerland
Cross-country skiers at the 1956 Winter Olympics
Place of birth missing (living people)